Éder Lima dos Santos (born 5 February 1986), known as Éder Lima (エデル・リマ), is a Brazilian footballer who plays as a central defender or left back for Sampaio Corrêa.

Career
Born in São Vicente, São Paulo, Éder played for Portuguesa's youth categories, but made his professional debuts with hometown's São Vicente Atlético Clube.

He then played for CENE, São José-SP, Atlético Sorocaba.

Noroeste
In November 2009, Éder signed with Noroeste. He played 13 matches and was eventually promoted with the club (to Série A-1).

Vila Nova
In May 2010, he was transferred to Vila Nova.

Santos
On 6 September 2011, Éder signed with Campeonato Brasileiro Série A giants Santos, with a contract during until 31 December.

On the following day, he made his debut on Santos, against Avaí, playing the last 4 minutes after coming off the bench to replace Elano.

After six games with Peixe, he was released, and signed with Oeste to the following year.

Al-Merrikh
At 2012, he has joined Sudan Premier League Al-Merrikh(Omdurman).

Tianjin Teda
At 2 February 2013, he has joined Chinese Super League side Tianjin Teda.

Beijing Enterprises Group
On 11 February 2015, Lima transferred to China League One side Beijing Enterprises Group.

Club statistics
Updated to end of 2018 season.

References

External links
Profile at Ventforet Kofu

1986 births
Living people
People from São Vicente, São Paulo
Brazilian footballers
Association football defenders
Campeonato Brasileiro Série A players
Campeonato Brasileiro Série B players
Esporte Clube Noroeste players
São José Esporte Clube players
Clube Atlético Sorocaba players
Vila Nova Futebol Clube players
Santos FC players
Oeste Futebol Clube players
Chinese Super League players
China League One players
Tianjin Jinmen Tiger F.C. players
Beijing Sport University F.C. players
Ventforet Kofu players
J1 League players
J2 League players
Brazilian expatriate footballers
Expatriate footballers in China
Brazilian expatriate sportspeople in China
Footballers from São Paulo (state)